Rolling with the Ronks! is a French animated children's television series created by Olivier Jean-Marie and Charles Vaucelle. The series was animated by Xilam Animation with the participation of France Télévisions and Disney Channel. The series debuted on Disney Channel in Poland on August 22, 2016.

Plot
Rolling with the Ronks! follows Flash, an alien who is sent to Earth, to the Ronk tribe in 37,520 BC to show them the future. To do this, the Ronk tribe are introduced to a variety of ideas. He is friends with two members of said tribe - Mila and Walter, who accompany him to try and prove he can succeed at his goal. However, Mormagnon along with Godzi (his pet lizard) will do anything to ruin his plans.

Characters
The main characters:
 Flash (voiced by Tom Kenny) is a blue alien with two eye-stalks. He acts as a mentor to the Ronk tribe, mostly showing the tribe's members a variety of new technology.
 Mila (voiced by Jessica DiCicco) is a cave girl. She is tomboyish and courageous, willing to try new ideas.
 Walter (voiced by Scott Whyte) is Mila's uncle. He is rather large. He is also well-meaning in assisting Flash, even if it means watching over his niece.

Other characters:
 Mormagnon (voiced by Charlie Adler) is the antagonist of the series. The uniquely hairy member of the tribe, he is greedy and petty.
 Mama (voiced by Cree Summer) is the chief of the tribe, happy to accept Flash's next idea. She appears to be the oldest member.
 Godzi (voiced by Dee Bradley Baker[episodes 1-12], Billy West [episodes 13-52]) is Mormagnon's pet, who resembles a frilled-neck lizard. While not as malicious as his owner, he can breathe fire - a trait sometimes used to the others' advantage.

Episodes

Pilot (2016)

Season 1 (2016–17)

Broadcast
The series premiered in France on February 6, 2017. The series premiered in Disney Channel in the United Kingdom and Ireland on July 22, 2017. The series was also broadcast in Germany. In the United States, the series airs on Primo TV.

References

External links

 
 

2010s French animated television series
2016 French television series debuts
2017 French television series endings
French children's animated comic science fiction television series
French children's animated science fantasy television series
French-language television shows
English-language television shows
Xilam
Disney Channels Worldwide original programming